Maderup Mølle  is a smock mill originally built in Maderup, about   south-west of Bogense, on the island of Funen in Denmark. It was constructed in 1832 and operated as a grain mill until the mid-1930s.The building was dismantled in 1941  and moved to The Funen Village, an  museum in Odense, where it now stands.

The windmill is built to an octagonal design. The upper part is reed-thatched, and the cap is thatched with straw.

References

Smock mills in Denmark
Thatched buildings in Denmark
Windmills completed in 1832
Nordfyn Municipality
Octagonal buildings in Denmark